The 2016 World RX of Argentina was the twelfth and final round of the third season of the FIA World Rallycross Championship. The event was held at the Autódromo Municipal Juan Manuel Fangio in Rosario, Santa Fe.

Heats

Semi-finals
Semi-Final 1

Semi-Final 2

Final

Standings after the event

References

External links

|- style="text-align:center"
|width="35%"|Previous race:2016 World RX of Germany
|width="40%"|FIA World Rallycross Championship2016 season
|width="35%"|Next race:2017 World RX of Barcelona
|- style="text-align:center"
|width="35%"|Previous race:2015 World RX of Argentina
|width="40%"|World RX of Argentina
|width="35%"|Next race:None
|- style="text-align:center"

Argentina
World RX
World RX